Mamma Mia! (promoted as Benny Andersson & Björn Ulvaeus' Mamma Mia!) is a jukebox musical written by British playwright Catherine Johnson based on songs recorded by Swedish group ABBA and composed by Benny Andersson and Björn Ulvaeus, members of the band. The title of the musical is taken from the group's 1975 chart-topper "Mamma Mia". Ulvaeus and Andersson, who composed the original music for ABBA, were involved in the development of the show from the beginning. Singer Anni-Frid Lyngstad was involved financially in the production and she was also present at many of the premieres around the world.

The musical includes such hits as "Super Trouper", "Lay All Your Love on Me", "Dancing Queen", "Knowing Me, Knowing You", "Take a Chance on Me", "Thank You for the Music", "Money, Money, Money", "The Winner Takes It All", "Voulez-Vous", "SOS" and "Mamma Mia". Over 65 million people have seen the show, which has grossed $4 billion worldwide since its 1999 debut. A film adaptation starring Meryl Streep, Colin Firth, Pierce Brosnan, Amanda Seyfried, Christine Baranski, Stellan Skarsgård and Julie Walters was released in 2008.

As of 2020, the show has productions in London's West End, where it is the sixth longest-running show in West End history, as well as various foreign productions. Its Broadway incarnation closed on September 12, 2015, after a 14-year run, making it the ninth longest-running show in Broadway history.

Background

Mamma Mia! is based on the songs of ABBA, a Swedish pop/dance group active from 1972 to 1982 and one of the most popular international pop groups of all time, topping the charts again and again in Europe, North and South America and Australia. Following the premiere of the musical in London in 1999, ABBA Gold topped the charts in the United Kingdom again. This musical was the brainchild of producer Judy Craymer. She met songwriters Björn Ulvaeus and Benny Andersson in 1983 when they were working with Tim Rice on Chess. It was the song "The Winner Takes It All" that suggested to her the theatrical potential of their pop songs. The songwriters were not enthusiastic, but they were not completely opposed to the idea.

In 1997, Craymer commissioned Catherine Johnson to write the book for the musical. In 1998, Phyllida Lloyd became the director for the show.

Various reviewers have noted a similarity in the plot between Mamma Mia and the 1968 film Buona Sera, Mrs. Campbell, previously adapted as the 1979 musical Carmelina, which is also about a woman who does not know which of three men is the father of her daughter, now a young woman. Some have even claimed that Mamma Mia is officially based on the 1968 film. Critic John Simon speculated that Mamma Mia is set in Greece and not Italy (which might have fit in better with the musical's title) in order to make the connection to the film less obvious. However, Johnson has denied being inspired by Buona Sera, Mrs. Campbell.

Productions

Original West End production

The musical opened in the West End at the Prince Edward Theatre on April 6, 1999, and transferred to the Prince of Wales Theatre on June 9, 2004, where it played until September 2012, when it moved to the Novello Theatre. Directed by Phyllida Lloyd with choreography by Anthony Van Laast, the original cast featured Siobhan McCarthy, Lisa Stokke, and Hilton McRae.

The show closed in March 2020 due to the COVID-19 pandemic in the United Kingdom, and reopened at the Novello Theatre on 25 August 2021.

Original Broadway and U.S. productions

Prior to the musical's Broadway engagement, it opened in Toronto at the Royal Alexandra Theatre in May 2000, where it played for five years. Its US debut was in San Francisco, California, at the Orpheum Theatre from November 17, 2000, to February 17, 2001, moving next to Los Angeles, California, at the Shubert Theatre from February 26 to May 12, 2001, and finally to Chicago, Illinois, at the Cadillac Palace Theatre from May 13 to August 12, 2001.

New York City run
The musical opened on Broadway at the Winter Garden Theatre on October 18, 2001, after beginning previews on October 5. The director was Phyllida Lloyd with choreography by Anthony Van Laast. As of October 2017, it was the ninth longest-running Broadway show and the longest-running jukebox musical in Broadway history. On April 18, 2013, it was announced that Mamma Mia! would transfer from its home at the Winter Garden Theatre to the Broadhurst Theatre later that year to make way for the musical adaptation of Rocky. The show played its final performance at the Winter Garden Theatre on October 19, 2013, and began performances at the Broadhurst Theatre on November 2, 2013.

It was announced on April 9, 2015, that the show would close on September 5, 2015. On April 21, 2015, it was then announced that the show would play an additional week and would instead close on September 12, 2015.  Mamma Mia! played 5,773 performances on Broadway before closing.

Foreign and touring productions

Mamma Mia! has been played in more than 50 countries in all 6 continents, including Argentina, Australia, Austria, Belgium, Brazil, Bulgaria, Canada, Chile, China, Colombia, Croatia, Czech Republic, Denmark, Dominican Republic, Germany, Estonia, Finland, France, Greece, Hungary, Iceland, Indonesia, Ireland, Israel, Italy, Japan, Jordan, Latvia, Lituania, Malaysia, Malta, Mexico, Monaco, Netherlands, New Zealand, Norway, Panama, Peru, Philippines, Poland, Portugal, Qatar, Romania, Russia, Serbia, Singapore, Slovakia, Slovenia, South Africa, South Korea, Spain, Sri Lanka, Sweden, Switzerland, Taiwan, Thailand, Turkey, United Arab Emirates, United Kingdom, and United States, and has been translated into multiple languages. Over 65 million people have seen the show worldwide and it has set the record for premiering in more cities faster than any other musical in history.

The first city to produce the show after London was Toronto, where it ran from May 23, 2000, to May 22, 2005, being the North America premiere of Mamma Mia!. The original cast included Louise Pitre as Donna and Tina Maddigan as Sophie, who both of them later reprised their roles in first US Tour and Broadway premiere.

Mamma Mia! played in Las Vegas, opening at the Mandalay Bay in February 2003 and closing on January 4, 2009.<ref>Gans, Andrew."Vegas Mamma Mia!, with Johnson, Extends to January 2009" . Playbill. 7 January 2008</ref> In June 2005, Mamma Mia! played its 1000th performance in Las Vegas, becoming the longest-running West End/Broadway musical in Las Vegas. The clothes and scenarios from this production are now used in Brazil. The show returned to Las Vegas on May 16, 2014, at the Tropicana Hotel & Casino, but announced its closing soon after on July 22.

The first North American tour started in San Francisco, California, on November 15, 2000, and closed in Boston, Massachusetts, on August 29, 2004. A second national tour opened in Providence, Rhode Island, on February 26, 2002, and closed in Appleton, Wisconsin, on August 26, 2012. This was followed by a non-Equity tour that opened in Orange, Texas, on September 28, 2016, and closed in St. Louis, Missouri, on July 30, 2017.

The first non-English version of the show debuted in Hamburg at the Operettenhaus, where it ran from November 3, 2002, to September 8, 2007. With the productions of Stuttgart (2004) and Essen (2007), Mamma Mia! became the first major musical to play concurrently in three German cities.

The show has had (and in some cases, still has) permanent productions in London, Toronto, Melbourne, New York, Hamburg, Tokyo (later transferred to Osaka, Fukuoka and Nagoya), Las Vegas, Utrecht, Seoul (later transferred to Seongnam and Daegu), Stuttgart, Madrid (later transferred to Barcelona), Stockholm (later transferred to Gothenburg), Antwerp, Moscow, Essen, Berlin, Oslo, Mexico City, Milan (later transferred to Rome), Copenhagen (later transferred to Aarhus), Paris, São Paulo, Shanghai, Buenos Aires, Vienna and Helsinki.

Since its premiere in Dublin on September 9, 2004 (with Helen Hobson as Donna) the international tour been seen by 5 million people. In addition there have been several touring productions worldwide, including Australia/Asia (2002–2005), Australia (2009–2010), China (2011-2012, 2013-2014, and 2018), France (2012–2013), Germany, Japan, Netherlands (2009–2010), Spain (2009–2011 and 2016–2017), South Africa (2010–2011), South Korea, United Kingdom (2016–2018 and 2019-2021), and Denmark (2020).

The Dutch actress Lone van Roosendaal has played Donna in three different countries: Netherlands, Belgium and Germany.

In the Original Danish Tivoli Copenhagen Cast it was actually Kristine Yde Eriksen as Sophie and Nadia Barbara Abrahamsen as Ali. But when the production moved to Aarhus Stine Louise Henriksen took over for Kristine Yde Eriksen as Sophie and Nadin Reiness took over for Nadia Barbara Abrahamsen as Ali. Stine Louise Henriksen was actually Kristine's understudy in Tivoli, Copenhagen and so was Nadin Reiness for Nadia.

The South African tour, conducted at the Artscape Theatre in Cape Town on August 11, 2010, and 3 months later at The Teatro, Montecasino in Johannesburg, featured an all local cast.

The first Chinese production opened on July 11, 2011, at the Shanghai Grand Theatre and closed on January 18, 2012, at Shanghai Cultural Square after a small tour, marking the first time that a blockbuster contemporary Western musical were presented in Mandarin in Shanghai (there was a previous Mandarin production of Beauty and the Beast in Beijing in 1999). It was seen by 250,000 people across six venues, with a total of 190 performances. Two Chinese actresses, Tian Shui, and Shadow Zhang both played the role of Donna in turn. In the following years, the production toured around China from time to time, performing 100~150 shows per year, until 2017. A revival of this production is now touring in China again, with the role of Donna played by Adia Chan Chung Ling, a Hong Kong TV/film star and pop singer famous in 1980~90'.

On January 24, 2012, Mamma Mia! opened in Manila at the Main Theater of the Cultural Center of the Philippines as part of the international Tour. The show was originally set to stay only for a week but with the positive response, the organisers decided that it would play until February 19, 2012. The show features Sara Poyzer as Donna Sheridan and Charlotte Wakefield as Sophie. The cast also included Kate Graham (Tanya), Jenny Dale (Rosie) and David Roberts (Sky).

A New Zealand tour production of Mamma Mia! opened at the Auckland Civic Theatre on March 4, 2014, featuring an all new set design by John Harding. International theatre star Deliah Hannah played Donna, and popular New Zealand entertainment icon Jackie Clark plays Rosie. The NZ tour visited 11 cities in 2014–2016.

The musical was originally performed on sailings of Royal Caribbean's Quantum of the Seas but was later moved to Allure of the Seas. Unlike other cruise ship performances of musicals, the show is performed in its entirety.

In Prague, the capital of the Czech Republic, the musical had its premiere on December 12, 2014.  Czech is the seventeenth language in which the musical was performed. At the date of the premiere a record 70,000 tickets were sold.

On February 21, 2015, the musical premiered in Warsaw, Poland at Roma Musical Theatre.

The Belgrade, Serbia – Terazije Theatre (Pozorište na Terazijama) premiere was on March 27, 2015.

On June 15, 2015, in Ljubljana, the capital of Slovenia, premiere of Slovene production took place in Križanke Outdoor Theatre as a part of Ljubljana Summer Festival (Poletni festival Ljubljana).

On March 18, 2016, Mamma Mia! opened for the first time in Panama City, Panama, at the Anayansi Theatre in the Atlapa Convention Centre, directed by Aaron Zebede.

On May 27, 2016, the first regional production opened at the Barter Theatre in Abingdon, Virginia.

On 31 August 2016, it was announced that the musical would once again tour Australia as a new, non-replica production to be directed by Gary Young. The premier was held in Canberra in November 2017 before continuing on a 1-year national tour to Brisbane, Sydney, Perth, Melbourne and finally Adelaide. The cast included Sarah Morrison as Sophie, Natalie O'Donnell as Donna, Jayde Westaby as Tanya, Alicia Gardiner as Rose, Ian Stenlake as Sam, Phillip Lowe as Harry, Josef Ber as Bill and Stephen Mahy as Sky. The production was nominated for the following Helpmann Awards: Best Musical, Best Choreography (Tom Hodgson), Best Actress (Natalie O'Donnell) and Best Actor (Ian Stenlake).

On 26 November 2016, the musical opened at the theatre Vanemuine in Tartu, Estonia. The original Estonian cast included Birgit Sarrap as Sophie, Ele Millistfer and Merle Jalakas as Donna, Kaire Vilgats as Rosie and Kaarel Targo as Sky among others. As of April 2019, the show keeps playing open end for high public demand.

From July 28 to July 30, 2017, Mamma Mia! was performed at the Hollywood Bowl. Directed and choreographed by Kathleen Marshall, the show starred Jennifer Nettles as Donna, Dove Cameron as Sophie, Corbin Bleu as Sky, Jaime Camil as Sam, Tisha Campbell-Martin as Tanya, and Lea Delaria as Rosie.

Nová scéna Theatre in Bratislava, Slovakia opened on November 11, 2017, for the first time in Slovak. In Slovakia were formerly performed Czech and original version.

A Finnish-language production premiered at the Messukeskus Helsinki in Helsinki, Finland on May 4, 2018.

A Bulgarian production opened on July 18, 2018, at the National opera and ballet in Sofia. There will be other shows on July 19, 20, 21, and 22, 2018.

A revival of the Dutch production premiered at the Beatrix Theater Utrecht in Utrecht, Netherlands on 6 September 2018.

A production of the musical by East West Players (EWP) in Los Angeles from May to June 2019 featured a cast with all artists of color, a majority of them Asian-Pacific Islander. The production made several allusions to Filipino culture (as this rendition of Donna and Sophie are a Filipina family living abroad), including Tagalog phrases, the tinikling folk dance, and traditional Filipino fashion The production was lauded for its inclusive casting decisions as well as its authentic portrayal of Filipino culture.

In 2019 a UK and International tour will run into 2020 starting at the Edinburgh Playhouse in September 2019 before heading to La Seine Musicale in October, The Bradford Alhambra Theatre in November, Bord Gais Energy Theatre in Dublin over the Christmas and new year period before continuing on the 22nd January 2020 at the Theatre Royal Newcastle before continuing to the Southampton Mayflower Theatre, Hull New Theatre,  Liverpool Empire Theatre, Birmingham Hippodrome, Bristol Hippodrome and finishing in August at the Theatre Royal Plymouth. More dates are to be added.

Also in 2019, a French-speaking adaptation produced by Just For Laughs was made in Quebec, having a run in Montreal in June, July, and December at the Théâtre Saint-Denis, immediately followed by Quebec City in August at the Salle Albert-Rousseau. The production sold over 75 000 tickets over its limited run.

Synopsis
Before the curtain rises, the orchestra starts playing the overture, which is a montage of instrumental versions of some of Abba's hit songs.

Act I

On the fictional Greek island of Kalokairi, 20-year-old Sophie is preparing to marry her fiancé, Sky. She wants her father to walk her down the aisle ("Prologue") but doesn't know who he is. Sophie discovers her mother's old diary and finds entries that describe intimate dates with three men; Sam Carmichael, Bill Austin and Harry Bright ("Honey, Honey").  Sophie believes one of these men is her father and, three months before her nuptials, sends each an invitation to her wedding, writing in her mother's name, Donna, without letting her unsuspecting mother know. All three men accept.

Donna begins receiving guests at her taverna. The first to arrive are her long-time best friends, Tanya, a rich woman who has been married and divorced three times, and Rosie, an unmarried, carefree woman. The trio used to comprise a girl group called "Donna and the Dynamos". The three women catch up and talk about their lives. Donna laments about the struggles of running the taverna singlehandedly ("Money, Money, Money").

Later that day, Sophie's three possible fathers arrive: Sam (an American architect), Harry (a British banker), and Bill (an Australian writer and adventurer). Sophie convinces them not to tell Donna that she invited them ("Thank You for the Music"). Donna is surprised to see her ex-lovers ("Mamma Mia") and leaves in tears. Donna, crying, explains to Tanya and Rosie the situation, and they cheer her up ("Chiquitita"). Tanya and Rosie try to convince Donna that she can still be the girl she once was ("Dancing Queen").

Sophie had hoped she would know her father the moment she saw him but is now only confused. She tries to tell her fiancé, Sky, how she feels without confessing what she has done. Sky tells her he will be the only man she ever needs, right before his buddies ambush him and take him to their bachelor party ("Lay All Your Love on Me").

At Sophie's hen party, Donna and the Dynamos don their old costumes and perform a song ("Super Trouper"). Sam, Bill, and Harry accidentally walk in on the party, and the guests persuade them to stay ("Gimme! Gimme! Gimme! (A Man After Midnight)").

Sophie first pulls Sam out of the room to talk to him. After he asks why he is there, she is overcome with guilt and goes to talk to Harry, instead. Harry asks if Sophie's father is at the party, and she tells him the whole truth.

Lastly, she draws Bill aside to talk with him. She learns that Bill has an aunt Sophia who left all her money to Donna's family. Bill learns that Donna built the taverna with money she inherited from a friend she lived with when Sophie was a baby; that friend was Bill's aunt. They both think this means he is her father.

Sophie asks Bill to walk her down the aisle, but Bill wants to discuss it first with Donna. This has been her secret, after all. No one knows yet that even Donna doesn't know who the father is, because she slept with the three men in such swift succession. Sophie insists they mustn't tell Donna anything ("The Name of the Game") and finally, Bill agrees.

Afterward, everybody crashes the hen party (including the guys from the stag party). During the party, Sam pulls Sophie aside and tells her he has figured out why she invited him. He knows he is her father and promises to walk her down the aisle the next day. Then, Harry approaches Sophie, apologizing for being so slow on the uptake; he is also convinced that she is his daughter and promises to walk her down the aisle. Sophie leaves the party, hopelessly confused; she doesn't want to turn any of them down ("Voulez-Vous").

Act II

(Entr'acte) Sophie's having a nightmare, involving her three possible fathers all fighting for the right to walk her down the aisle and wakes up despairing ("Under Attack").

Sophie's upset, and Donna assumes that Sophie wants to cancel the wedding and offers to handle all the details. Sophie's offended and vows that her children won't grow up not knowing who their father is. As Sophie storms out of the room, Sam enters and tries to tell Donna that Sophie may not be all she seems, but Donna won't listen ("One of Us"). She hates Sam; at the end of their affair, she said she never wanted to see him again.  But it seems that Sam was the man Donna cared about the most, and both of them wish they could go back to the start ("SOS").

At the beach, Harry asks Tanya what the father of the bride ought to be doing for Sophie's wedding. Tanya explains that for her part, her father gave her his advice and then paid. Pepper, one of the guys who works at Donna's taverna, makes advances to Tanya, but she rebuffs him ("Does Your Mother Know").

Sky finds out what Sophie has done in inviting Sam, Harry and Bill to the wedding. He accuses her of wanting a big white wedding only so that she can find out who her father is. He's very hurt that she kept this plan a secret from him. He storms off just as Sam walks in. Sam tries to give Sophie some fatherly advice by describing his failed marriage ("Knowing Me, Knowing You"), but Sophie isn't consoled.

Harry offers to Donna to pay for the wedding, and they reminisce about their fling ("Our Last Summer"). Sophie arrives and Donna helps her get dressed. She can't believe her daughter is going to be a bride ("Slipping Through My Fingers"). Donna admits that her own mother disowned her when she learned that she was pregnant. They reconcile and Sophie asks her mother if she will walk her down the aisle. Sam arrives and tries to speak to Donna again, but she doesn't want to see him, and asks him to leave. He refuses, and a bitter confrontation ensues. Donna tells Sam that he broke her heart, presumably when she found out he was engaged ("The Winner Takes It All"). It emerges that the two still love each other dearly, albeit against Donna's better judgment.

Rosie is making final preparations in the taverna when Bill arrives. He's upset because he has received a note that Donna will be walking Sophie down the aisle. Bill reaffirms his commitment to the single life, but Rosie has become attracted to him, and urges him to reconsider ("Take a Chance on Me"). They are about to have sex in the taverna, but the guests arrive, leaving Rosie quite stunned.

The wedding begins, with Donna walking Sophie down the aisle. Before the priest has a chance to begin the ceremonies, Donna acknowledges to everyone that Sophie's father is present. Sophie tells her mother that she knows about her father. Donna realizes that Sophie invited them to the wedding for that very reason. The issue of Sophie's parentage is left unsettled, as none of them have any idea whether they are actually her father. Everyone involved agrees that it doesn't matter which one of them her biological parent is, as Sophie loves all three and they are all happy to be "one-third of a father" and a part of her life at last. Finally, Harry, who has made frequent references to his "other half" throughout the show, is revealed to be in a committed gay relationship.

Suddenly, Sophie calls a halt to the proceedings. She isn't ready to get married and Sky agrees with her about not getting married. Sam seizes his chance and proposes to Donna in order to prevent the wedding preparations from going to waste. He explains that he loved her, even when he left to get married. It is revealed that he called off the wedding and came back to the island, only to be told that Donna was going out with another man (Bill). He went back, married his fiancée and had children but he got divorced. Surprisingly, Donna accepts ("I Do, I Do, I Do, I Do, I Do"). In the end, Sam and Donna are married, and at the end of the night, Sophie and Sky depart on a round-the-world tour ("I Have a Dream").

Finale and encore
After their final bows to the audience, the ensemble performs a reprise of "Mamma Mia". A reprise of "Dancing Queen" follows, during which Donna, Tanya and Rosie are revealed wearing brightly colored ABBA inspired costumes. The cast ends the finale with "Waterloo", during which Sam, Bill, and Harry join the rest of the cast onstage in brightly colored costumes that match the leading ladies. The Dynamos and the dads often invite the audience to clap, dance, and sing along during the finale.

Musical numbers

Act I
 "Overture/Prologue" - Sophie
 "Honey, Honey" - Sophie, Ali and Lisa
 "Money, Money, Money" - Donna, Tanya, Rosie, Pepper and Company
 "Thank You for the Music" - Sophie, Sam, Harry and Bill
 "Mamma Mia" - Donna and Company
 "Chiquitita" - Donna, Tanya and Rosie 
 "Dancing Queen" - Donna, Tanya and Rosie
 "Lay All Your Love on Me" - Sky, Sophie and Male Ensemble 
 "Super Trouper" - Donna, Tanya, Rosie and Female Ensemble
 "Gimme! Gimme! Gimme! (A Man After Midnight)" - Female Ensemble
 "The Name of the Game" - Sophie and Bill
 "Voulez-Vous" - Company

Act II
 "Entr'acte" - Orchestra
 "Under Attack" - Sophie and Company  
 "One of Us" - Donna
 "SOS"  - Donna & Sam
 "Does Your Mother Know" - Tanya, Pepper and Company
 "Knowing Me, Knowing You" - Sam
 "Our Last Summer" - Harry and Donna
 "Slipping Through My Fingers" - Donna and Sophie
 "The Winner Takes It All" - Donna
 "Take a Chance on Me" - Rosie and Bill
 "I Do, I Do, I Do, I Do, I Do" - Sam, Donna and Company 
 "I Have a Dream" - Sophie

Encore
 "Mamma Mia"  - Company
 "Dancing Queen"  - Donna, Tanya, Rosie and Company
 "Waterloo" - Company

Notes on the music
During the preview period in London, the musical had the song "Summer Night City" just after the prologue. The "Summer Night City" scene was a wedding rehearsal and during the song, Ali, Lisa, Tanya, and Rosie arrived on the island. The song was removed, although a small instrumental part of it remains as underscoring to connect the end of "The Winner Takes It All" and "Take a Chance on Me". Several lines of "Summer Night City" are also heard in the "Entr'acte".

Donna hums a few lines of "Fernando", when she repairs the doors of the taverna just before she sees her three former lovers.

The song that Sky briefly sings before starting "Lay All Your Love on Me" varies from one production to another, including "King Kong Song", "Summer Night City", "Dum Dum Diddle", and "She's My Kind of Girl", a Björn & Benny song.

The wedding march that is played as Sophie walks down the aisle is a slower arrangement of "Dancing Queen".

The creators also intended to include "Just Like That", an unreleased ABBA song recorded in 1982. The song was apparently dropped just before the first public previews in March 1999, though it was listed in the program available during the preview period.

The last three songs, performed as an encore/finale by the whole cast are: "Mamma Mia", "Dancing Queen" and "Waterloo". The version of "Mamma Mia" used in the encore/finale is sung by the Company. The finale song Mamma Mia has been extended in theatres where Donna and the Dynamos had to go downstairs for taking the stage lift in Dancing Queen. Then, during the intro of "Dancing Queen", Donna, Tanya and Rosie join the Company (as the girl-power band "Donna and the Dynamos", wearing ABBA's 1970s-style colorful and flashy costumes). Sam, Bill and Harry join them during Waterloo, wearing male versions of the girls' ABBA's costumes. The Encore is included on the 5th Anniversary Cast Recording (commemorating said anniversary for the Broadway production).

Principal roles and casts

 Film adaptations Mamma Mia! was adapted as a film, produced by Judy Craymer and Gary Goetzman, written by Catherine Johnson directed by Phyllida Lloyd and with Tom Hanks, Rita Wilson, Björn Ulvaeus, and Benny Andersson as executive producers. Meryl Streep stars as Donna Sheridan and Amanda Seyfried as Sophie and Pierce Brosnan as Sam Carmichael. The movie also features Christine Baranski, Dominic Cooper, Colin Firth, Stellan Skarsgård and Julie Walters. It premiered July 18, 2008, in the US.  Most of the songs remained intact with the exceptions of "Under Attack", "One of Us", "Knowing Me, Knowing You", and "Thank You for the Music". "Knowing Me, Knowing You" was used as the wedding music and "Thank You for the Music" is sung during the second half of the end credits. The first half is occupied with a "Dancing Queen" reprise and "Waterloo", with a "Mamma Mia" reprise and "I Have a Dream" sung before the credits (though the latter is sung as Sophie mails the invitations at the start of the film). "When All Is Said and Done", a song not used in the musical, was added for the film sung by Sam, Donna, and the company. "Our Last Summer" was used earlier in the movie, with Sophie, Bill, Sam, and Harry singing it. "The Name of the Game", while filmed, was subsequently edited out of the film for the final cut.  The song is included in full on the motion picture soundtrack  – an abbreviated version of the song and scene appear on the DVD/Blu-ray as a supplement. In addition, "Thank You for the Music" is used as a hidden track, and is performed by Amanda Seyfried.

A sequel to the film titled Mamma Mia! Here We Go Again was released in 2018. It tells the story of how Donna met each of the 3 men who are potentially Sophie's father. "One of Us" and "Knowing Me, Knowing You" are both included in this film.

Awards and nominations

Original West End production

Original Broadway production

Original North American tour

Response

Box office and business

On May 15, 2005, Mamma Mia! surpassed the original Broadway runs of The Sound of Music, The King and I, and Damn Yankees with 1,500 performances.  On March 6, 2014, it surpassed Rent to become the 8th longest-running Broadway musical and 9th longest-running show of all time with 5,124 performances, then surpassed Beauty and the Beast's 5,462 performances that same year, on December 14, to become Broadway's 7th longest-running musical and 8th longest-running show. The Broadway run ended on September 12, 2015, with its 5,758th performance, and was passed two years later (August 16, 2017) by Wicked to move one spot down in the list of longest-running Broadway shows.

When Mamma Mia! opened in Russia, it received a very positive response. As of January 2008, Mamma Mia! became the longest daily running show in the history of Russian theatre.

Thematic analysisMamma Mia! does not only heighten a nostalgic and emotional reactions to the ABBA fans, it has also been celebrated for its feminist overtones. The musical features strong female protagonists living in a strong female-power community. The theme of single motherhood breaks the family stereotype of a child being raised by both parents by showing a different perspective of a family raised single-handedly by a mother, to show that there can still be happiness and love. Having Donna, her two good friends and her daughter, Sophie as the main strong female characters of the musical, it can be seen as an empowerment for women as it celebrates and caters to the rise in liberation of female in the society, female sexuality, refuses to shame Donna for her promiscuity, and because it asserts that women should prioritise following their goals and enjoying their youths over marriage. It also celebrates female friendship, and undermines the importance of fathers in women's lives, prioritising self-actualisation and the role of the mother instead. Librettist Catherine Johnson manages to express these themes through her transformation of ABBA's music, as she turns these somewhat stereotypical songs into empowering ones by having characters of different genders sing them.

See also
 
 Abbacadabra, another musical based on the songs of ABBA

References

 Further reading 
 George Rodosthenous: Mamma Mia! and the Aesthetics of the Twenty-First-Century Jukebox Musical. In: Robert Gordon (ed.), Olaf Jubin  (ed.): The Oxford Handbook of the British Musical. Oxford University Press, 2017,  pp. 613–632
 Malcom Womack: Thank You For the Music: Catherine Johnson's feminist revoicings in Mamma Mia!. In: Studies in Musical Theatre, volume 3, no. 2, November 2009, pp. 201–211
 Jana B. Wild: On a Romantic Island: Shakespeare and Mamma mia. In:  Multicultural Shakespeare: Translation, Appropriation and Performance, 2019, pp. 151–161
 Naomi Graber: Memories that remain: Mamma Mia! and the disruptive potential of nostalgia.  In: Studies in Musical Theatre, volume 9, no. 2, June 2015, pp. 187–198
 Elaine Aston: Work, Family, Romance and the Utopian Sensibilities of the Chick Megamusical Mamma Mia!. In: A Good Night Out for the Girls.'' Palgrave Macmillan, London, 2013, pp. 114–133

External links

 
 

 
1999 musicals
ABBA
Broadway musicals
Greece in fiction
Helpmann Award-winning musicals
Jukebox musicals
Plays set in Greece
West End musicals
Musicals by Benny Andersson
Musicals by Björn Ulvaeus